The 2nd Pennsylvania Cavalry (59th Volunteers) was a cavalry regiment that served in the Union Army during the American Civil War.

Service
The 2nd Pennsylvania Cavalry was organized in Harrisburg and Philadelphia, Pennsylvania beginning in September 1861 as the "59th Volunteers" and mustered in for three years service under the command of Colonel Richard Butler Price.

The regiment was attached to Sturgis' Command, Military District of Washington, to August 1862. John Buford's Cavalry Brigade, II Corps, Army of Virginia, to September 1862. Price's Cavalry Brigade, Defenses of Washington, to March 1863. 2nd Brigade, Stahel's Cavalry Division, XXII Corps, to June 1863. Provost Guard, Army of the Potomac, to December 1863. 2nd Brigade, 2nd Division, Cavalry Corps, Army of the Potomac, to February 1865. Provost Guard, Army of the Potomac, to June 1865.

The 2nd Pennsylvania Cavalry ceased to exist on June 17, 1865, when it was consolidated with the 20th Pennsylvania Cavalry to form the 1st Regiment Pennsylvania Provisional Cavalry.

Detailed service
Seven companies dismounted and left Pennsylvania for Baltimore, Maryland, April 1, 1862. Five companies joined the regiment at Baltimore April 14, 1862. Moved to Washington, D.C., April 25, and camped on Capitol Hill until June 27. Duty in the defenses of Washington, D.C., until July 27, 1862. Moved to Warrenton, then to Madison Court House, Va., July 27-August 5. Action at Wolftown August 7. Battle of Cedar Mountain August 9. Pope's Campaign in northern Virginia August 16-September 2. Chantilly September 1. Reconnaissance to Thoroughfare Gap and Aldie September 16. Antietam September 16-17. Ashby's Gap September 22. Duty in the defenses of Washington, D.C., until June 1863. Reconnaissance to Snicker's Ferry and Berryville November 28-30. Berryville November 30. Frying Pan, near Chantilly, December 27-28. Occoquan December 29. Mrs. Violet's and Seleman's Ford, near Occoquan, March 22, 1863 (detachment). Expedition from Gainesville June 7-8 (detachment). Headquarters Guard for General Meade June 29. Battle of Gettysburg July 1-3. Provost duty at Gettysburg July 5-7. Old Antietam Forge, South Mountain, Md., July 10. Provost Guard duty with the Army of the Potomac until December. Bristoe Campaign October 9-22. Near Bealeton October 22. Fayetteville October 23. Advance to line of the Rappahannock November 7-8. Mine Run Campaign November 26-December 2. New Hope Church November 27. Parker's Store November 29. Expedition to Luray December 21-23. Luray December 23. Campaign from the Rapidan to the James May-June 1864. Todd's Tavern May 5, 6, 7, and 8. Sheridan's Raid to the James River May 9-24. North Anna River May 9-10. Ground Squirrel Church and Yellow Tavern May 11. Brook's Church, fortifications of Richmond, May 12. Line of the Pamunkey May 26-28. Totopotomoy May 28-31. Haw's Church May 28. Cold Harbor May 31-June 1. Sheridan's Trevilian Raid June 7-24. Louisa Court House June 10. Trevilian Station June 11-12. White House or St. Peter's Church June 21. Black Creek or Tunstall's Station June 21. Germantown June 22. St. Mary's Church June 24. Charles City Cross Roads June 29. Warwick Swamp and Jerusalem Plank Road July 12. Demonstration on north side of the James River at Deep Bottom July 27-29. Malvern Hill July 28. Warwick Swamp July 30. Demonstration north of the James River at Deep Bottom August 13-20. Gravel Bill August 14. Strawberry Plains August 16-18. Deep Bottom and Malvern Hill August 18. Dinwiddie Road, near Ream's Station, August 23. Ream's Station August 25. Belcher's Mills September 17. Poplar Springs Church September 29-October 2. Arthur's Swamp September 30-October 1. Boydton Plank Road, Hatcher's Run, October 27-28. Reconnaissance toward Stony Creek November 7. Stony Creek Station December 1. Expedition to Hicksford December 7-11. Bellefield December 8. Dabney's Mills, Hatcher's Run, February 5-7, 1865. On provost duty, Army of the Potomac, until June 1865. Fall of Petersburg April 2. Pursuit of Lee April 3-9. Appomattox Court House April 9. Surrender of Lee and his army. March to Washington, D.C., May. Grand Review of the Armies May 23.

Casualties
The regiment lost a total of 253 men during service; 6 officers and 52 enlisted men killed or mortally wounded, 2 officers and 193 enlisted men died of disease.

Commanders
 Colonel Richard Butler Price - promoted to brevet brigadier general March 13, 1865
 Colonel William W. Sanders

See also

 List of Pennsylvania Civil War regiments
 Pennsylvania in the American Civil War

References
 Ceremonies of the Dedication of the Monument of the Second Pennsylvania Cavalry, (Fifty-Ninth Regiment) on the Battle-field of Gettysburg, on Pennsylvania Day, September 11, 1889 (Williamsport, PA: Gazette and Bulletin Printing House), 1890.
 Dyer, Frederick H.  A Compendium of the War of the Rebellion (Des Moines, IA:  Dyer Pub. Co.), 1908.
 Second Pennsylvania Cavalry First Annual Reunion Held at Harrisburg: Election of Officers and Action Concerning a Regimental Monument (Williamsport, PA: Second Pennsylvania Cavalry Association), 1889.
Attribution

External links
 2nd Pennsylvania Cavalry monument at Gettysburg

Military units and formations established in 1861
Military units and formations disestablished in 1865
Units and formations of the Union Army from Pennsylvania